Lieutenant Colonel Thomas Bernard Hackett  (15 June 1836 – 5 October 1880) was born in Riverstown, County Tipperary and was an Irish recipient of the Victoria Cross, the highest and most prestigious award for gallantry in the face of the enemy that can be awarded to British and Commonwealth forces.

Details
He was 21 years old, and a lieutenant in the 23rd Regiment of Foot (later The Royal Welch Fusiliers), British Army during the Indian Mutiny when the following deed took place for which he was awarded the VC. On 18 November 1857 at Secundra Bagh, Lucknow, India, Lieutenant Hackett, with George Monger, rescued a corporal of his Regiment, who was lying wounded and exposed to heavy fire. He also showed conspicuous bravery when, under heavy fire, he ascended the roof and cut the thatch of a bungalow to prevent its being set on fire. His citation reads:

He later achieved the rank of lieutenant colonel. He died at Arrabeg, King's County (now County Offaly) in a firearm accident on 5 October 1880. His VC is on display in the Lord Ashcroft Gallery at the Imperial War Museum, London.

Arms

References

The Register of the Victoria Cross (1981, 1988 and 1997)

Ireland's VCs  (Dept of Economic Development, 1995)
Monuments to Courage (David Harvey, 1999)
Irish Winners of the Victoria Cross (Richard Doherty & David Truesdale, 2000)

External links
 Location of grave and VC medal (Co. Tipperary, Ireland)
 
 Picture of Hackett's medals

Irish recipients of the Victoria Cross
Irish Anglicans
Royal Welch Fusiliers officers
People from County Tipperary
1836 births
1880 deaths
19th-century Irish people
Irish officers in the British Army
Indian Rebellion of 1857 recipients of the Victoria Cross
Deaths by firearm in the Republic of Ireland
Firearm accident victims
British Army personnel of the Crimean War
British military personnel of the Third Anglo-Ashanti War
British Army recipients of the Victoria Cross
Accidental deaths in the Republic of Ireland
Military personnel from County Tipperary